Vivek Ashok Mahbubani (born 25 September 1982) a.k.a. Ah V, is a stand-up comedian in Hong Kong, a musician and an award-winning new media designer.

Biography 
Vivek is a Sindhi of Indian descent and was born and raised in Hong Kong. He grew up in an Indian household where he spoke English and says he faced a lot of cultural challenges because he was surrounded by non-Indians.  He graduated from Diocesan Boys’ School and City University of Hong Kong with a degree in creative media in 2005 and currently runs his own design firm.

Vivek is also a stand-up comedian in Hong Kong, performing in both English and Cantonese. He is a regular headliner and host at The TakeOut Comedy Club Hong Kong. In 2007, Vivek won the Cantonese-language category of the competition to find Hong Kong's funniest person and was a finalist in the English language category. In 2008, Vivek won the English language category of the competition.

Vivek is the drummer and an original member of Eve of Sin, a Metalcore band based in Hong Kong. As of September 2016 the band is on a hiatus.

In 2008, Vivek was hired by Citibank to endorse its mobile financial services in Hong Kong.

In 2010, Vivek was the official announcer for Hong Kong's first Mixed Martial Arts event hosted by Legend Fighting Championship.

See also 
 HK International Comedy Festival
 The TakeOut Comedy Club Hong Kong

Notes

References

External links 
 

1982 births
Living people
Indian stand-up comedians
Hong Kong people of Indian descent
Hong Kong people of Sindhi descent
Hong Kong Hindus
Sindhi people
Hong Kong stand-up comedians